Comtec Racing is a motor racing team based in the United Kingdom. It competes in three championships — Formula Renault, World Series by Renault and the Auto GP World Series.

History

The team started out in Formula Ford from the ashes of the Van Diemen works team. Team Principal Piere Moncheur has guided the team since its formation.

The Formula Ford UK 2003 Championship was a 3-car assault, Tom Gaymor claimed 5th place, Oliver Jarvis finished 8th and Dan Clarke finished 12th.

For 2004 a 2-car assault on the Formula Renault UK Championship was launched with Westley Barber and Susie Stoddart (now Susie Wolf) as drivers. Westley finished runner up in the championship with Susie achieving 3 podiums and finishing 5th. Susie Wolf is now a test driver for the Williams F1 team.

The team then moved up to compete in the European and French Formula Renault Championships for 2005 with Westley Barber and Pippa Mann. Westley ran out of funds halfway through the year after a promising start which included a 2nd-place finish at the season opener and Pippa was very much on a learning curve with a best finish of 14th.

In 2006, Comtec moved up once more and competed in the  World Series by Renault. In there maiden year Alx Danielsson won the championship. Halfway through the year a nightmare weekend at Spa proved the turning point for Alx Danielsson, he wrote his car off twice but after that five podiums which included four wins in 8 races gave Alx the crown in a great comeback. Pippa Mann continued to drive in the Formula Renault Eurocup with a best finish of 15th.

In 2007, the team used several drivers. Alejandro Núñez finished highest with 13th in the standings with one win.

In 2008, Marco Bonanomi and Pasquale Di Sabatino joined the team. Bonanomi won two pole positions but finished 11th. Di Sabatino was replaced for the final four races by Duncan Tappy.

Also in 2008 The team bought out the formula ford constructor Spirit and brought in the former UK champion Westley Barber alongside Brazilian rookie Francisco Weiler. Westley had a good start to the year and the car was good but the Mygale was better and in the hands of Wayne Boyd it dominated. Westley achieved two 2nd-place finishes at Brands Hatch, a 3rd and 4th place at Knockill and two other 5th-place finishes before the curtain was pulled down on the venture half the way through the season.

In 2009, still pursuing the Renault 3.5 world series Jon Lancaster led the team. He gained a pole position and one win after joining the championship halfway. The other seat changed between Anton Nebylitskiy, Harald Schlegelmilch, Alexandre Marsoin, John Martin, Max Chilton and Alberto Valerio.

In 2010 the team was led by Stefano Coletti and finished 5th. Greg Mansell was the team's other driver.

In 2011, Comtec signed rookies Daniel Mckenzie and Daniël de Jong. New Zealander Chris Van Der Drift tested the car to help the two Daniels in there quest to improve. but to little effect, just 2 points in the teams championship was all they could muster.

For 2012 Comtec Signed Nick Yelloly and Vittorio Ghirelli. Nick scored 2 wins for the team on his way to a creditable 5th-place finish overall in the championship. Vittorio endured a long learning curve but showed improvement with good drives  ending with 5 points for the season.

2013 saw the team rebranded to SMP Racing by Comtec and the promotion of Phil Blow to team manager. Series veteran Daniil Move has signed for the season and will be partnered by Lucas Foresti.

The team has also just announced a partnership with Virtuosi Racing with an entry into Auto GP for Venezuelan Roberto La Rocca with a view to entering 2 cars in 2014 alongside their assault on the World Series By Renault. At the first race in Auto GP Roberto La Rocca scored a creditable 8th-place finish which meant starting from pole for the 2nd race on a reverse grid. Roberto was running 5th before being pushed off, he went on to finish a creditable 7th. Better than the two drivers in the parent team Virtuosi Racing.

The team was based close to the Snetterton Motor Racing Circuit in Norfolk.

After 16 years of racing Comtec Racing closed its doors for the last time in 2017. Fond memories of ups and downs have been made for mechanics, engineers, drivers and other staff for sure.

Club Racing History
Comtec has had a successful period in single seater club racing. Former team owner Jonathan Lewis won the 2003 and 2004 Monoposto 2000 series and also the 2003 Formula 4 Championship. His brother Chris Lewis won the Formula 4 Championship in 2006.

John Roberts and Steve Patania also had race wins in Formula 4.

The team endured a great battle and friendly rivalry with ABM Racing Adrian Kidd and Barry Pritchard. Adrian Kidd won the championship in 2004, and Barry Pritchard in 2005

The team then ran Adrian Kidd's 16-year-old son Ben Kidd in the inaugural season of SAXMAX in 2006 after sadly Adrian died.

Television appearances
In June 2007, the team's WSR car was featured in the BBC television programme Andrew Marr's History of Modern Britain; Marr driving the car to illustrate the political scandal in 1997 between Bernie Ecclestone and the newly elected Labour Party. The team has also appeared in the BBC motoring programme Top Gear, where presenter Richard Hammond drove a Comtec Formula Renault and then World Series by Renault car before moving up to a Renault Formula One car.

Results

World Series by Renault

Auto GP

British Formula Ford

Formula Renault UK 2.0 Winter Series

Formula Renault UK 2.0

Formula Renault Eurocup 2.0

Championnat de France Formula Renault 2.0

Formula Three

Monoposto 2000

750MC Formula 4

Saxmax

Notes:
1. - Iaconelli also entered in 4 races for EuroInternational and 6 races for GD Racing.
2. - Míguez also scored 1 point in 11 races for Pons Racing.
3. - van Lagen also entered in 2 races for EuroInternational.
4. - Nebylitskiy also scored 1 point in 13 races for SG Formula.
5. - Greg Mansell also scored 3 points in 13 races for Ultimate Motorsport.

References

External links
Comtec Racing

British auto racing teams
World Series Formula V8 3.5 teams
Formula Renault Eurocup teams
British Formula Three teams
Auto racing teams established in 2001
2001 establishments in the United Kingdom
GP3 Series teams
British Formula Renault teams
Auto GP teams
Auto racing teams disestablished in 2017